Prathipadu Mandal is one of the 21 mandals in Kakinada District of Andhra Pradesh. As per census 2011, there are 36 villages.

Demographics 
Prathipadu Mandal has total population of 79,076 as per the Census 2011 out of which 39,501 are males while 39,575 are females. The Average Sex Ratio of Prathipadu Mandal is 1,002. The total literacy rate of Prathipadu Mandal is 57.1%. The male literacy rate is 52.17% and the female literacy rate is 48.85%.

Towns & Villages

Villages 

Bapannadhara
Bavuruvaka
Buradakota
China Sankarlapudi
Chintaluru
Dharmavaram
Doparthi
Gajjanapudi
Girijanapuram
Gokavaram
K. Mirthivada
Kondapalle
Kothuru
Lampakalova
Mettu Chintha
P. Jagannadhapuram
Pandavulapalem
Peda Sankarlapudi
Peddipalem
Podurupaka
Pothuluru
Prathipadu
Rachapalle
Sarabhavaram
Thaduvai
Thotapalle
U. Jagannadhapuram
Uligogila
Uttarakanchi
Vakapalle
Vanthada
Vemulapalem
Venkatanagaram
Vommangi
Yeluru
Yerakampalem

See also 
List of mandals in Andhra Pradesh

References 

Mandals in Kakinada district
Mandals in Andhra Pradesh